Gone to Texas (often abbreviated GTT), was a phrase used by Americans emigrating to Texas in the 19th century. During the Panic of 1819, many left the United States and moved there to escape debt. Moving to Texas, which at the time was part of Mexico, was particularly popular among debtors from the South and West.

Emigrants or their abandoned neighbors often wrote the phrase on doors of abandoned houses or posted as a sign on fences.

While speaking in Nacogdoches, Texas in early 1836, shortly before his death at The Alamo, Davy Crockett is quoted regarding his last campaign for Congress:
A gentleman from Nacogdoches, in Texas, informs us, that, whilst there, he dined in public with col. Crockett, who had just arrived  from Tennessee. The old bear-hunter, on being toasted, made a speech to the Texians, replete with his usual dry humor. He began nearly in this style: "I am told, gentlemen, that, when a stranger, like myself, arrives among you, the first inquiry is—what brought you here? To satisfy your curiosity at once as to myself, I will tell you all about it. I was, for some years, a member of congress. I was beaten, gentlemen, and here I am." The roar of applause was like a thunder-burst.

In the 21st-century, The phrase “Gone to Texas” can still be used as Texas is currently the second most populous state in the United States and is experiencing strong population growth by migration with an estimated July 2019 population of 28.996 million.

References

Further reading

 

Texas culture
English-language idioms
Catchphrases
1810s neologisms